The Unfoldment is a lost 1922 silent film feature directed by George Kern and starring Florence Lawrence. It was produced by an independent company.

Only a fragment of this film survives in the Library of Congress collection.

Cast
Florence Lawrence - Katherine Nevin
Barbara Bedford - Martha Osborne
Charles K. French - James Osborne
William Conklin - Charles MacLaughlin
Albert Prisco - Angus
Lydia Knott - Mrs. MacLaughlin
Raymond Cannon - Jack Nevin
Murdock MacQuarrie - Mayor of Avenue A
Wade Boteler - Ted Packham
R. L. Frost - Christ  .. (*note:possibly poet Robert Frost)

References

External links
 The Unfoldment at IMDb.com

1922 films
American silent feature films
American black-and-white films
Lost American films
Silent American drama films
1922 drama films
Associated Exhibitors films
1922 lost films
Lost drama films
1920s American films